Royal Hunt is a Danish progressive metal band. The band was founded in 1989 by keyboardist André Andersen in order to combine basic values of classic rock with progressive, current musical elements.   The name originated from a painting seen in a museum by the founding member/keyboardist André Andersen.

History 
Royal Hunt is known for creating melodic music with a progressive and symphonic flair. They experienced success during the mid-90s with American vocalist D.C. Cooper on their albums Moving Target and Paradox mainly in Japan and Europe.

Throughout their history the band has experienced several lineup changes. In 2007 they acquired singer Mark Boals, who replaced former vocalist John West. In 2011 after numerous requests from fans and promoters worldwide they decided to reunite with their former vocalist D. C. Cooper for a special tour, covering the first four albums of the band. They recorded a new album entitled Show Me How to Live featuring the returning D.C. Cooper as their permanent vocalist moving forward. Cooper also provided vocals for the 2013 album, A Life to Die For, and again provided vocals on "Devil's Dozen", "Cast In Stone" and "Dystopia – Part 1".

In October 2021, the group announced the completion of songwriting for the new album – "Dystopia – Part 2". The album will be released on 28 October 2022.

In Japan, the band is famous for the song Martial Arts, which was used as entrance music for professional wrestler Masahiro Chono.

Discography

Studio albums 

 Land of Broken Hearts (1992)
 Clown in the Mirror (1994)
 Moving Target (1995)
 Paradox (1997)
 Fear (1999)
 The Mission (2001)
 The Watchers (2001)
 Eyewitness (2003)
 Paper Blood (2005)
 Collision Course... Paradox 2 (2008)
 X (2010)
 Show Me How to Live (2011)
 A Life to Die For (2013)
 Devil's Dozen (2015)
 Cast in Stone (2018)
 Dystopia (2020)
 Dystopia – Part II (2022)

Live albums 
 1996 (1996)
 Closing the Chapter (1998)
 Double Live in Japan (1999)
 2006 Live (2006)
 Cargo (Live) (2016)
 2016 Live (2017)

Singles/EPs 
 The Maxi – Single (1994)
 Far Away (EP) (1995)
 "Message to God" (1997)
 Intervention (2000)

Compilations 
 The First 4 Chapters... and More (Japan release) (1998)
 The Best (Japan release) (1998)
 The Best Live (Japan release) (1998)
 On the Mission 2002 (Japan release) (2002)
 Heart of the City (Best of 1992–1999) (2012)
 20th Anniversary (2012)

Members 

 André Andersen (keyboards, piano, keytar, rhythm guitar) (1989–present)
 D. C. Cooper (lead vocals) (1994–1999, 2011–present)
 Andreas Passmark (bass) (2009–present)
 Jonas Larsen (lead guitar) (2011–present)
 Andreas "Habo" Johansson (drums) (2015–present)

Former members 
 Henrik Brockmann (vocals) (1989–1994)
 John West (vocals) (1999–2007)
 Mark Boals (vocals) (2007–2011)
 Kenneth Olsen (drums) (1989–1996; 2004–2007)
 Jacob Kjaer (lead guitar) (1993–2003)
 Marcus Jidell (lead guitar, cello) (2004–2011)
 Steen Mogensen (bass, keyboards) (1989–2003)
 Per Schelander (bass) (2005–2009) (Covered for Andreas Passmark during parts of the tour 2015 and during the tour 2016 )
 Allan Tschicaja (session drums) (2002–2004)
 Allan Sørensen (drums) (1996–2002; 2007–2015)

Timeline

References

External links

Century Media Records artists
Danish hard rock musical groups
Danish heavy metal musical groups
Danish progressive metal musical groups
Musical groups established in 1989
Musical quintets
Magna Carta Records artists
Frontiers Records artists
Scarlet Records artists